Andrea Faciu (born 1977 in Bucharest) is a Romanian artist who has lived in Germany since 1991.

She graduated from the Academy of Fine Arts, Munich, where she studied with Olaf Metzel.
She lives in Munich, Germany and Berlin.

Awards
2007 Villa Romana prize

Exhibitions
2010 Renaissance Society of Chicago 
2009 La Biennale di Venezia, the Romanian Pavilion
2009 OPEN e v+ a, Limerick

References

External links
"Andrea Faciu in Dialogue", vlad morariu visual and textual archive
"The Seductiveness of the Interval" (Romanian Pavilion – 53rd International Art Exhibition – La Biennale di Venezia) 18 June 2009

German artists
1977 births
Artists from Bucharest
Living people